Henry Pershing Strzelecki (August 8, 1939 – December 30, 2014) was a Nashville studio musician who performed with Roy Orbison, Chet Atkins, Waylon Jennings, Willie Nelson, Eddy Arnold, Bob Dylan, Johnny Cash, Ronnie Milsap, Merle Haggard, and many others.

Born in Birmingham, Alabama, Strzelecki began playing country music in his teens. He wrote the novelty song "Long Tall Texan," which was a hit for The Beach Boys. He worked with Chet Atkins for many years, both in the studio and on tour. He was considered a primary member of the Nashville A-Team and worked with nearly every star to come out of Nashville in the 1960s, 1970s and 1980s.

In 1987 he was nominated for Bassman of the Year at the 23rd Academy of Country Music Awards.

Strzelecki was struck by a car in Nashville on December 22 and died of his injuries on December 30, 2014.

See also
The Nashville A-Team
Strzelecki (disambiguation)

References

1939 births
2014 deaths
Musicians from Birmingham, Alabama
Musicians from Nashville, Tennessee
American session musicians
20th-century American bass guitarists
Guitarists from Tennessee
American male bass guitarists
20th-century American male musicians